Myriam Harry was the pen name of Maria Rosette Shapira (April 1869 – 10 March 1958), a French journalist and writer.

The daughter of Moses Wilhelm and Anna Magdalena Rosette Shapira (née Jöckel), she was born in Jerusalem. Her father, originally from Ukraine in Czarist Russia and a convert from Judaism to Christianity, committed suicide and the family moved to Berlin. She later moved to Paris. She became secretary to Jules Lemaître. Shapira worked for La Fronde and also wrote several journals in Paris. In 1902, she published her first novel, Petites Épouses. Her 1903 work La Conquête de Jérusalem received the first Prix Femina, which was created in 1904 especially for her, since she was excluded from consideration for the Prix Goncourt because she was a woman.

In 1904, Shapira married Emile Perrault.

She also wrote accounts of her travels in the Middle East, Africa and Asia. Her reportage of the trial of insurgents accused of murdering French settlers in the Thala-Kasserine Disturbances was instrumental in securing clemency for those sentenced to death.

She died in Neuilly-sur-Seine, France.

Selected works 
 La Divine chanson (1911)
 La petite fille de Jérusalem (1914)
 Siona chez les Barbares (1918)
 Siona à Paris (1919)
 Le Tendre cantique de Siona (1922)
 Les Amants de Sion (1923)
 La Nuit de Jérusalem (1928)
 La Jérusalem retrouvée (1930)

References 
Cécile Chombard Gaudin, "L'Orient dévoilé - Sur les traces de Myriam Harry, biographie", Levallois, Editions Turquoise, 2019

1869 births
1958 deaths
Israeli emigrants to France
20th-century French novelists
20th-century French women writers
19th-century French Jews
French women journalists
Prix Femina winners
Pseudonymous women writers
20th-century pseudonymous writers